Nelson C. Hahne (December 9, 1908 – October 4, 1970) was a professional illustrator, author and magician. He served as illustrator for numerous magic books, and magic catalogs. He was the resident artist for The Linking Ring magazine for over forty years.

Works with Hahne illustrations

Ireland Writes a Book (19??)
Modern Coin Magic (19??)
Here's Magic (1930), by Joe Berg
Match-ic (1936), by Martin Gardner; Ireland Magic Company
Here's New Magic (1937), "by Joe Berg" (actually ghostwritten by Martin Gardner)
After the Dessert (1941), by Martin Gardner; Max Holden
Cut the Cards (1942), by Martin Gardner; Max Holden
Annemann's Practical Mental Effects (1944), by Theodore Annemann (edited by John J. Crimmins Jr.); Max Holden
Nelson Enterprises catalogs and books.
Secrets of the Crystal Silence League by Alexander, The Man Who Knows (2019)

References 
The Linking Ring December 2007 pp. 40–45

1908 births
1970 deaths
American illustrators
American magicians